The canton of Bugey savoyard is an administrative division of the Savoie department, southeastern France. It was created at the French canton reorganisation which came into effect in March 2015. Its seat is in Yenne.

Composition

It consists of the following communes:

Avressieux
La Balme
Billième
Champagneux
Chanaz
La Chapelle-Saint-Martin
Chindrieux
Conjux
Gerbaix
Jongieux
Loisieux
Lucey
Marcieux
Meyrieux-Trouet
Motz
Novalaise
Ontex
Rochefort
Ruffieux
Sainte-Marie-d'Alvey
Saint-Genix-les-Villages
Saint-Jean-de-Chevelu
Saint-Paul
Saint-Pierre-d'Alvey
Saint-Pierre-de-Curtille
Serrières-en-Chautagne
Traize
Verthemex
Vions
Yenne

Councillors

Pictures of the canton

References

Cantons of Savoie